The 2002 Nevada Wolf Pack football team represented the University of Nevada, Reno during the 2002 NCAA Division I-A football season. Nevada competed as a member of the Western Athletic Conference (WAC). The Wolf Pack were led by third–year head coach Chris Tormey and played their home games at Mackay Stadium.

Schedule

Game summaries

vs. Washington State

BYU

Rice

Colorado State

at UNLV

at Hawaii

San Jose State

at Louisiana Tech

at SMU

UTEP

at Fresno State

Boise State

References

Nevada
Nevada Wolf Pack football seasons
Nevada Wolf Pack football